This is a list of Lord Sankey's decisions from the Judicial Committee of the Privy Council. Sankey served as the Lord Chancellor from 7 June 1929 – 7 June 1935. Prior to his appointment to the JCPC, Sankey served as Lord Justice of Appeal in 1928 and High Court, King's Bench Division, in 1914.

1928-1929

1930-1931

1932-1933

1934-1935

1936-1937

1938-1939

1940-1941

1942-1943

See also
Lord Sankey's lower court judgments
List of Judicial Committee of the Privy Council cases
List of Judicial Committee of the Privy Council cases originating in Canada

Sankey
Legal history of the United Kingdom
Case law lists by judge